Cornell Glacier (old spelling: Ikigssûp Sermerssua) is a tidewater glacier in Avannaata municipality on the northwestern shore of Greenland. It drains the Greenland ice sheet westwards into Nuussuup Kangia, a fjord inlet of Sugar Loaf Bay, to the east of the base of Nuussuaq Peninsula.

References 

Sugar Loaf Bay
Glaciers of the Upernavik Archipelago